Nature is a compilation album by the New Zealand rock band The Mutton Birds. The album, a selection of songs from the band's first two albums, was released in 1995 in the UK.

Another compilation, Box of Birds, a double CD repackaging of the entire two albums, was released in New Zealand two months later with an almost identical cover. Box of Birds spent three weeks in the New Zealand album charts and peaked at No. 42.

Track listing
(All songs by Don McGlashan except where noted)
 "Nature" (Wayne Mason) — 3:40
 "Dominion Road" — 3:48
 "Anchor Me" — 4:30
 "The Heater" (McGlashan, Alan Gregg, David Long, Ross Burge) — 4:25
 "Giant Friend" — 3:50
 "Your Window" — 4:16
 "White Valiant" — 5:11
 "In My Room" — 4:34
"A Thing Well Made" — 4:38
 "Queen's English" — 6:27
 "There's a Limit" (Gregg) — 4:17
 "Too Close to the Sun" (McGlashan, Long) — 5:35

Personnel
Don McGlashan – guitars, vocals, euphonium, melodica
Ross Burge – drums, autoharp
Alan Gregg – bass guitar, vocals, keyboards
David Long – guitar, vocals, keyboards, banjo

References

1995 albums
The Mutton Birds albums